Volleyball events were contested at the 1978 Asian Games in Bangkok, Thailand.

Medalists

Medal table

Results

Men

Preliminary round

Pool A

Pool B

Pool C

Classification 7th–12th

Final round

Women

References
 Men's Results
 Women's Results

 
1978 Asian Games events
1978
Asian Games
Asian Games